WoongSan (born Kim Eun Young) is a South Korean musician, actress and TV show host. She has been a leading figure in the jazz music scene in Korea and Japan for over a decade, having performed live over 500 times since her 1998 Japanese debut. She is the first Korean-born musician to perform at New York City's historic Blue Note Jazz Club and has collaborated with many other well-known jazz musicians including Benny Green, Lonnie Plaxico, Rodney Green, Conrad Herwig and Suzuki Hisatsugu. She is also well known for training Ali (South Korean singer), a popular K-pop singer.

Biography
When she was 18, WoongSan spent a year and a half at a Buddhist temple in the Korean countryside. During her training she had a powerful realization: her calling in life was music. Initially she played in a college rock band, but after a friend played her a Billie Holiday record, she began to dedicate herself to jazz. She spent several years performing as a solo artist then released her first album accompanied by a jazz ensemble in 1996. By the end of 1998 she was a recognizable figure in both Korea and Japan, and since then, she has released six albums, garnered numerous awards and critical acclaim, and continues to tour prolifically. She has also written many songs for films.

Last year, she proved her career was an ongoing path as a music performer on the stage collaborated with Lee Ritenour.

Style
WoongSan's style is a distinctive blend of jazz, blues, Latin and funk style. Her mid-low voice does not span as much tonal ground as other famous singers, but what she lacks in range she more than makes up for in creativity and malleability. As an independent lyricist, Woong San has penned powerful ballads, cozy love numbers and everything in between. Buddhism has played a prominent role in her life, and it shines through in her songwriting: she often explores the themes of freedom, mindfulness and the beauty of change in her songs. Her work has been described as "soulful, fearless, sultry."

Albums

Awards
1993 MBC Korean Popular Music Festival's "Best Singer' award
 2001 MM Jazz's (jazz magazine), "best Artist" award
 2003 MM Jazz's "Best Musician" award
 2008 Korean Popular Music Awards' "Best Jazz & Crossover Album" award
 2008 Reader Poll magazine's "best Vocalist" award
 2010 Swing Journal's "Gold Disc" award for her album <Close Your Eyes> 
 2011 Jazz Criticism's "Jazz Disc Grand Prize" award

State honors

Soundtracks
 "Elegy" for Korean TV show, Kyungsung Scandal
 "I Think I Loved You" for Korean TV show, Mother, Sister
 Participated in OST for Korean TV show, Lema Lee, the Sun
 "Destiny" for Korean TV show, Ill Ji Mae
 "In the Mood"  for Korean film, Who Slept With Her? 
 "Pierro's Mask"  for Korean film, The Shadow Murder
 "Outrageous Love" on soundtrack for Korean TV show, Chuno
 "You Make Me" on soundtrack for Korean TV Show, Kiss Sixth Sense

Notes

References

1973 births
Living people
Blues musicians
K-pop singers
South Korean women pop singers
South Korean jazz singers
20th-century South Korean women singers
21st-century South Korean women singers
South Korean Buddhists